P. nathaliae can refer to:

 Plakina nathaliae, a species of sea sponge
 , a species of flowering plant